NA-110 Jhang-III is a constituency for the National Assembly of Pakistan. It comprises Shorkot Tehsil (including Shorkot Cantonment), the city of Ahmedpur Sial, and some areas of Jhang Tehsil (Bagh, Kot Lakhnana, and Magiana).

Members of Parliament

2018-2022: NA-116 Jhang-III

Election 2002 

General elections were held on 10 Oct 2002. Saima Akhtar Bharwana an Independent candidate won by 56,647 votes.

Election 2008 

General elections were held on 18 Feb 2008. Saima Akhtar Bharwana an Independent candidate won by 64,759 votes.

Election 2013 

General elections were held on 11 May 2013. Sahibzada Muhammad Nazeer Sultan of PML-N won by 52,106 votes and became the  member of National Assembly.

Election 2018 

General elections were held on 25 July 2018.

See also
NA-109 Jhang-II
NA-111 Nankana Sahib-I

References

External links 
Election result's official website

NA-090